Sue Moxley may refer to:

 Sue Moxley (television presenter), English television presenter, fashion model and singer
 Sue Moxley (bishop), Anglican Bishop of Nova Scotia and Prince Edward Island, Canada